Genoa  is an unincorporated town in Douglas County, Nevada, United States. Founded in 1851, it was the first settlement in what became the Nevada Territory. The population was 939 at the 2010 census. It is home to the oldest bar in the state of Nevada which opened in 1853.

History

Genoa was first settled by Mormon pioneers in what was then the Mexican territory of Alta California. The settlement originated as a trading post called Mormon Station, which served as a respite for travelers on the Carson Route of the California Trail. In June 1850, following the Mexican Cession, H.S. Beatie and fellow Mormons built a roofless log enclosure and corral as a trading post near a small stream. Migrants could obtain clothing, tobacco, meat, canned goods, coffee, beans, sugar, flour and bacon. The post was abandoned later that year. In 1851, John Reese arrived in the area with horses, cattle and a dozen wagons loaded with supplies to establish a permanent trading post. By 1852, migrant traffic through the area was heavy and the settlement expanded. A post office opened, a blacksmith shop was built, and sawmills were built. In 1856, Orson Hyde changed the name of the community to Genoa, after the Italian city. The original Mormon settlers withdrew in 1857 when they were recalled by Brigham Young due to the Utah War. Genoa served as the first capital of the Nevada Territory in 1861, until it was moved that year to Carson City.

Nevada's first newspaper, the Territorial Enterprise, was founded in Genoa in 1858, but moved to Virginia City in 1860. It was the site of the first ranch in Nevada.

Much of Genoa, including the original fort, station, and hotel, was destroyed in a fire in 1910, but a replica of the fort was built in 1947. Every year since 1919, Genoa has held a festival called the Candy Dance, where candy, food, and crafts are sold to support its town government. The Candy Dance is usually held during the final weekend of September. Many pioneers rest in the Genoa graveyard, including Snowshoe Thompson, his wife and his son.

A mile south of Genoa is David Walley's Resort, a famous natural hot springs and spa. It was first built in 1862 and known as Walley's Hot Springs. On October 1, 1934, Baby Face Nelson and members of his gang arrived at Walley's Hot Springs, hiding out for a month before returning to Chicago, where Nelson was shot by FBI agents.

Scenes from the 1973 movie Charley Varrick were filmed in Genoa, and the village was the set for the 1990 movie Misery, starring Kathy Bates, when the village doubled in size with buildings added and then removed after the filming.  Food writer M. F. K. Fisher wrote a series of cookbook reviews for The New Yorker from her sister's home in Genoa during the 1960s.

Genoa Historic District

The Genoa Historic District, seven miles north of Minden, Nevada, is a portion of the community of Genoa which, as a  historic district was listed on the U.S. National Register of Historic Places in 1975.  Historically known as Mormon Station, the historic area includes Late Victorian architecture;  it includes a courthouse and city hall among 29 contributing buildings.

Geography

Nevada State Route 206 enters Genoa from the south as Foothill Road, then turns east in the center of town onto Genoa Lane.

Climate
The area has a Köppen Climate Classification of Csb, which is a dry-summer subtropical climate often referred to as "Mediterranean".

Demographics

See also

 Mormon Station State Historic Park

Notes

References

External links

 

Census-designated places in Douglas County, Nevada
Unincorporated towns in Nevada
Pony Express stations
Populated places established in 1850
Nevada State Register of Historic Places
1851 establishments in Utah Territory
Victorian architecture in Nevada
Historic American Buildings Survey in Nevada